Inkblot Productions is a film production company founded in 2010 by Naz Onuzo, Zulumoke Oyibo, Damola Ademola and Omotayo Adeola. Inkblot Productions produced The Wedding Party and its sequel, both ranking first and second on the list of highest-grossing Nigerian films of all time.

In 2021, Amazon Prime Video signed a three-year deal with Inkblot Productions for exclusive streaming.

Productions

References

Nigerian film studios
Companies based in Lagos
Film production companies of Nigeria